Konda Madhava Reddy (1923–1997) is a former Chief Justice of Hyderabad High Court and Bombay High Court, and former member of the Council of Smaller States, New Delhi. Justice Reddy was an eminent personality in Indian judiciary at large and educational, cultural and social organizations in the state of Andhra Pradesh.

Personal
Justice Konda Madhava Reddy was born on 21 October 1923, to Shri Konda Venkata Ranga Reddy and Tungabhadramma at Sahrajpet in Nalgonda district of State of Andhra Pradesh. He hailed from a distinguished family of freedom fighters. His father Konda Venkata Ranga Reddy was a congress leader, revenue minister and Deputy Chief Minister of State of Andhra Pradesh from 1957 thru 1962.

He was married to Jayalatha Devi. The couple had 3 daughters and 1 son, Konda Vishweshwar Reddy, who is a Member of Parliament from Chevella Lok Sabha constituency in Telangana.

Justice Reddy among his peers is remembered as a soft-spoken, thoughtful, contemplative, reasonable and fair with an innate sense of justice. He is often cited as persuasive and thorough with facts and the law. As a person, he was a complete gentleman, always kind, helpful and unassuming. He was never agitated, never given to fury, eschewed passionate views and brought to any discussion, clarity of thought enabling those around him to take the right decision. He was an educationist, a scholar and a jurist.

Justice Konda Madhava Reddy died on 25 September 1997, after suffering from non-Hodgkin lymphoma.

Education
 Government High School at Chaderghat, Hyderabad
 Bachelors in Political Science and Economics from Nizam College, Hyderabad
 MA Economics, Ferguson College, Pune University
 LLB from Bombay University

Career

Judicial
Justice Konda Madhava Reddy had a prominent and successful career in Indian judiciary spanning over five decades. During his career, he held high ranks, to list a few:
 Pleader of AP High Court (1944)
 Advocate of AP High Court (1956)
 Public Prosecutor AP High Court (1967)
 Judge AP High Court (1968)
 Commissioner Cuddapah Police Firing (1973)
 Acting Chief Justice of AP High Court (1982)
 Chief Justice of AP High Court (1983)
 Chief Justice of Bombay High Court (1983-1985)
 Acting Governor of State of Maharashtra (1985)
 Chairman of Central Administrative Tribunal (CAT) (1985-1988)
 Senior Advocate of Supreme Court of India (1988-1997)

Educationist
Justice Konda Madava Reddy was founder and on the forefront of several educational, social and cultural organizations in the state of Andhra Pradesh. Following is a list of various organizations which he led. Some of these were founded by him.
 Syndicate and Dean of Law at Kakatiya University, Warangal
 Board Member at Kakatiya University, Warangal
 Board Member at Osmania University, Hyderabad
 Board Member at Nagarjuna University, Hyderabad
 Member of Indian Hockey Federation
 Chairman of Chaitanya Bharati Education Society
 Chairman of Chaitanya Bharati Institute of Technology
 Chairman of Kuchupudi Art Academy
 Chairman of Andhra Vidyalaya Education Society
 Chairman of Indira Seva Sadan Trust High School

References

Telugu people
1923 births
People from Telangana
1997 deaths
Judges of the Andhra Pradesh High Court
People from Nalgonda district
Chief Justices of the Andhra Pradesh High Court
20th-century Indian judges
Chief Justices of the Bombay High Court
Deaths from cancer in India
Deaths from non-Hodgkin lymphoma